KCDM-LP (98.3 FM) is a radio station licensed to Burlington, Iowa, United States.  The station is currently owned by Burlington Educational Association.

References

External links
 
 

CDM-LP
CDM-LP
Burlington, Iowa